Rumen Yordanov (17 October 1957 – 2 August 2010) was a Bulgarian wrestler. He competed in the men's freestyle 48 kg at the 1980 Summer Olympics.

References

1958 births
2010 deaths
Bulgarian male sport wrestlers
Olympic wrestlers of Bulgaria
Wrestlers at the 1980 Summer Olympics
People from Targovishte Province